Nelumbo lutea is a species of flowering plant in the family Nelumbonaceae.  Common names include American lotus, yellow lotus, water-chinquapin, and volée.  It is native to North America.  The botanical name Nelumbo lutea Willd. is the currently recognized name for this species, which has been classified under the former names Nelumbium luteum and Nelumbo pentapetala, among others.

Description
American lotus is an emergent aquatic plant. It grows in lakes and swamps, as well as areas subject to flooding. The roots are anchored in the mud, but the leaves and flowers emerge above the water's surface.

Flowering begins in late spring and may continue into the summer.  The specific name means "yellow" in Latin and refers to the flowers, which may be white to pale yellow. The flowers measure  in diameter and have 22-25 petals.

It is the larval host plant of the American lotus borer, Ostrinia penitalis.

However, Nelumbo lutea populations are declining in the U.S. due to habitat destruction, and it has been listed as threatened or endangered in New Jersey, Michigan, and Pennsylvania, and extirpated in Delaware. Their populations have a low level of genetic diversity, showing variation among different populations rather than within populations.

Range
The native distribution of the species is Minnesota to Oklahoma, Florida, Mexico, Honduras, and the Caribbean. It was apparently distributed northwards in the United States by Native Americans who carried the plant with them as a food source.

Uses
This plant has a large tuberous rhizome that is used as a food source. This may be the plant called "macoupin" in Miami-Illinois. The seed is also edible and is known as "alligator corn". The seedlike fruits can be shaken loose, and are also edible. The unopened leaves and young stalks can be cooked.

The species is widely planted in ponds for its foliage and flowers. American Lotus spreads via creeping rhizomes and seeds. This species has been crossed with N. nucifera to create many hybrids. Seeds may be propagated by scarifying the pointed tip of the seed with a file then soaking in water.  Propagation is also possible by division of established plants.

Other media

Disney's character Princess Tiana wears as her iconic princess dress, a gown fashioned from a yellow Nelumbo lutea.

References

American Lotus, Illinois Natural History Survey
Illiniwik Food Sources
Prairie Place Names, Illinois Department of Natural Resources

Edible plants
lutea
Plants described in 1799
Freshwater plants
Flora of North America
Pre-Columbian Great Plains cuisine
Tubers
Rhizomatous plants